Lecanocerus is a genus of scuttle flies (insects in the family Phoridae). There is at least one described species in Lecanocerus, L. compressiceps.

References

Further reading

 
 

Phoridae
Articles created by Qbugbot
Platypezoidea genera